Big Spring State Park can refer to either of two state parks in the United States:

Big Spring State Park (Texas)
Big Spring State Forest Picnic Area in Pennsylvania